Johnny Kapahala: Back on Board is a 2007 Disney Channel Original Movie. It is the sequel to Johnny Tsunami. The movie premiered on Disney Channel on June 8, 2007 with a U.S. viewership of 1.3 million, placing third in its timeslot.

Plot summary
Johnny "Pono" Kapahala, a teen snowboarding champion from Vermont, returns to Oahu, Hawaii, for the wedding of his grandfather, local surf legend Johnny Tsunami. Johnny is excited for the marriage as he anticipates having an uncle to hang out with, but eventually realizes his "Uncle Chris" is a 12-year-old brat.

The next day, Sam and Johnny catch Chris heading off with the Dirt Devils, a team of dirtboarders. They follow him to a barge set up with a skate park. Before Chris can skate, Johnny and Sam show him up by skating the barge. Annoyed, Chris runs away. When he gets home, he gets into a fight with Johnny and tells him to leave him alone. So, the next morning Johnny goes surfing. He bumps into Valerie, a member of the Dirt Devils Chris has a crush on, and gives her a surfing lesson, which makes Chris jealous and upset. Forced to hang out with Chris, Johnny and Sam blackmail him into coming along with them for a day. With Val, they go dirtboarding and ride ATVs. To his surprise, Chris has a good time, and he and Johnny finally start to get along.

The group heads out to a dirtboarding event to meet Akoni Kama and possible sponsors, but the Dirt Devils kick Val out of their group for hanging with Johnny and Chris, the "competition". Chris runs away from home again, and when Johnny and Sam find him, Chris is fighting with Jared, the leader of the Dirt Devils, on joining his group. Chris agrees to do a dangerous jump the next day during the rehearsal dinner for Carla and Johnny's wedding, which is also the night before the opening of the shop.

Carla decides to move back to Pennsylvania in a conversation with Johnny's grandpa, which Chris overhears. After getting some encouragement from Val, he feels guilty about causing their break-up, but doesn't know how to mend it.  Johnny then says that Chris is lucky he has a smart nephew and eventually, with help from Val, Sam and Johnny fix the surf shop. They decide to stop hanging out with the Dirt Devils. The opening of Johnny's grandpa's store is a huge success, and even pro dirtboarder Akoni Kama comes. Meanwhile, across the street, the Dirt Devils find Troy in a heated argument with Val's dad over negotiations for him to move to California.

Johnny and Chris finally reach terms of friendship and Chris helps Johnny with the race by describing the course set up by Val's father. The race begins with Troy in the lead for a large portion of the time, until the ending when he falls when doing one of three required tricks and crashes into the barrier at the finish line. Johnny wins and Troy is arrested after the police find out he told Jared, who is released back into his parents' custody, to trash the shop. Carla and Johnny's Grandpa finally decide to get married, and both families are finally happy.

Cast
 Brandon Baker as Johnny "Pono" Kapahala
 Jake T. Austin as Chris
 Cary-Hiroyuki Tagawa as Grandpa Johnny "Tsunami" Kapahala
 Robyn Lively as Carla
 Mary Page Keller as Melanie Kapahala
 Yuji Okumoto as Pete Kapahala
 Jonathan McDaniel as Sam Sterling
 Andrew James Allen as Jared
 Rose McIver as Valerie "Val"
 Phil Brown as Troy
 Akoni Kama as himself
 Thomas Newman as Bo
 Fasitua Amosa as Officer
 William Wallace as Officer

Mountainboarding
Mountainboarding stunts performed by:
 Akoni Kama
 Leon Robins
 Kody Stewart
 Jarrad Cronin
 Ryan Slater
 Ben Toulmin
 Joe Lawry

Home media
The DVD was released on October 9, 2007.

References

 Handy Mickey News
NZ Film and Video Technicians' Guild

External links
 
 DCOM Website with Johnny Kapahala: Back on Board section
 

Disney Channel Original Movie films
2007 television films
2007 films
Films set in Hawaii
Films directed by Eric Bross
Films scored by Nathan Wang
Television sequel films
Films shot in New Zealand
Skateboarding films
2000s American films